Agostinho Barbosa (Agostino, Augustinus) (17 September 1589, at Aldão, Guimarães, Portugal – 22 March 1649, in Ugento, Italy) was a prolific Portuguese writer on canon law. His work included dictionary-type surveys of the legal elements.

Life

Having studied canon law in Portugal, he went to Rome. Being without the means to purchase books, he memorized their contents in libraries. About 1632 he went to Madrid, where he applied himself to writing and fulfilled various duties confided to him until 1648. He was consecrated Bishop of Ugento in Rome on 22 March 1649.

Works

His works fill at least 30 volumes. They show intimate acquaintance with authors, sources, and controversial questions such as the following:

 Pastoralis Sollicitudinis, sive de Officio et Potestate Episcopi Tripartita Descriptio (Rome, 1621; Lyons, 1629; in folio, 1641, 1650, etc.).
 Variae Juris Tractationes, a similar work relating to parish priests was published in Rome in 1632, Lyons, 1634, Geneva, 1662, Venice, 1705, in quarto; in folio, Lyons, 1631 and 1644, Strasburg, 1652.
 Juris Ecclesiastici Universi Libri III (Lyons, 1633, 1645, 1718).

All the canonical works of Barbosa were published at Lyons, 1657–75, in 19 vols. In quinto, 16 vols. in folio, and again, 1698–1716, 20 vols. in quinto, 18 vols. in folio.

References
 Hurter in Kirchenlexikon, s. v.

Notes

External links and additional sources
 (for Chronology of Bishops) 
 (for Chronology of Bishops) 
Catholic Encyclopedia article
Tarlton Law Library page

1589 births
1649 deaths
Canon law jurists
Portuguese Roman Catholic bishops
17th-century Italian Roman Catholic bishops
People from Guimarães
Bishops in Apulia
17th-century Portuguese writers
17th-century male writers